Association Park is the name of two different baseball grounds which were located in Kansas City, Missouri, United States.

Association Park (I)

This ballpark was home to the Kansas City Cowboys of the National League for the 1886 season. It was initially known as League Park. It was built in a low area that was once a pond. It became a heat sink during the peak of summer, and became derisively dubbed "The Hole."

It was later the home field for Kansas City entry in the Western League (1887) and then the Kansas City entry in the AA (1888).

As described in contemporary newspapers, it was on a block bounded by Lydia Avenue (east, first base); Sixth Street (south, third base); John Street and Tracy Avenue (west, left field); and Independence Avenue (north, right field) [Kansas City Times, May 1, 1886, p.5]

When the park opened, local newspapers were effusive in their praise, saying, "The grounds are not surpassed by those in any city in the league." [Kansas City Times, May 1, 1886, p.5]

By 1888, between the frequently poor showing of the various teams, along with the tendency of the low-lying field to accumulate smelly, swampy water, local papers had considerably changed their tune, calling it, "One of the worst base ball parks in the country." [Kansas City Times, January 21, 1888, p.4]

The field was abandoned to developers after 1888. 

The ballpark site is now the home of the Al-Taqwa Islamic Center.

Association Park (II)

This ballpark was home to the Kansas City Blues American Association entry during about 1902 through 1922. It was also home to the Kansas City Monarchs during 1920-1922.

It was on a block bounded by Prospect Avenue (east, left field); East 20th Sreet (south, right field); Olive Street (west, first base); and railroad tracks (north, third base). Both clubs moved to the new and nearby Muehlebach Field in 1923. The lot was converted into a public park, called Blues Park.

External links
History of Kansas City sports

Sports venues in Missouri
Defunct Major League Baseball venues
Demolished sports venues in the United States
Sports venues in Kansas City, Missouri